The Grand Slam Cup was a tennis tournament held annually at the Olympiahalle in Munich, Germany from 1990 through 1999. The event was organized by the International Tennis Federation (ITF), which invited the best-performing players in the year's Grand Slam events to compete in the Grand Slam Cup.

History
The tournament was created in 1990 and was played on indoor carpet courts. From 1990 to 1996, it was held in December but was moved to the middle of autumn from 1997 to 1999. From 1990 to 1997 the tournament was limited to male players. A women's Cup was added in 1998 and was held simultaneously with the men's Cup.

Throughout its existence, the Grand Slam Cup was famous for paying out the highest prize money of any tournament in tennis. The winner for the first three years of the Cup received U.S.$2 million in prize money, which dipped to $1.625 million in 1993, rose to $1.875 million in 1996 and back to $2 million in 1997 before falling to $1.3 million in 1998. If the Cup was won by a player who had also won a Grand Slam event that year they received a bonus of $1 million. Prize money for the winner of the two women's Cups was fixed at $800,000.

The Grand Slam Cup was not recognized by the Association of Tennis Professionals (ATP) and participants did not receive points in the ATP computer rankings nor have it credited as an official career title. Following the discontinuation of the Cup in 1999, the ATP decided to give the event retroactive recognition and added it to players' record of official titles. A compromise between the ITF and the ATP was announced on December 9, 1999 which merged the Cup with the ATP Tour World Championship, the ATP's year-end tournament also held annually in Germany, giving birth to the ATP World Tour Finals, an official tour event.

A direct result of the merging of the two competitions can still be seen in the qualification rules for the ATP World Tour Finals, which included one notable difference from those of the prior ATP Tour World Championship. The Tour World Championship was meant to include the top eight players on the ATP computer rankings at the end of a season, even though this could mean the exclusion of a Grand Slam champion who had not been able to earn sufficient ranking points in the rest of the year. Present Finals rules ensure the participation of a Grand Slam champion who is unable to earn a top eight ranking at the end of the season and automatic qualification for the top seven players in the computer rankings. The eighth ranked player, however, qualifies only if all Grand Slam singles champions are among the top eight. Any Grand Slam event champion who is not in the top eight but is still in the top twenty is included to the detriment of the eighth ranked player. This situation occurred at the 2004 Tennis Masters Cup, where Andre Agassi, the 8th ranked player in the ATP Champions Race, was excluded from the event in favor of Gastón Gaudio, who had won that year's French Open but was ranked 10th at the end of the year.

Pete Sampras was the most successful player at this event winning two titles out of three final appearances.

Qualification 
Qualification and seeding for the Grand Slam Cup were not related to the ATP computer rankings. Points were allocated to a player based on his Grand Slam performances, and after all four Grand Slam events had concluded the 16 players with the most points – 12 in 1998 and 1999 – qualified for the Cup. Grand Slam champions were not assured of a berth in the event.

Format of play 
In the men's tournament the first two rounds of the Cup were the best of three sets while the semifinals and final were the best of five sets. There was no tie-break if a match went over the full distance.

In the women's tournament all rounds were best of three sets.

Finals

Men

Women

Draws

1990
Date: December 11 – December 16

1991
Date: December 10 – December 15

1992
Date: December 8 – December 13

1993
Date: December 7 – December 12

1994
Date: December 6 – December 11

1995
Date: December 5 – December 10

1996
Date: December 3 – December 8

1997
Date: September 23 – September 28

1998

Date: September 29 – October 3

Men

Women

1999
Date: September 27 – October 4

Men

Women

References

External links
 Association of Tennis Professionals (ATP) tournament details

 
Defunct tennis tournaments in Germany
Carpet court tennis tournaments
Indoor tennis tournaments
Sports competitions in Munich
1990 establishments in Germany
1999 disestablishments in Germany
Recurring sporting events established in 1990
Recurring sporting events disestablished in 1990